The Little Switzerland is a 2019 Spanish comedy film directed by Kepa Sojo and starring Maggie Civantos, Jon Plazaola, Ingrid García-Jonsson and Secun de la Rosa. It is set in the Basque Country. It based on the British comedy film Passport to Pimlico (1949), the Treviño enclave dispute, and the Spanish comedy film Welcome Mr. Marshall!.

According to Jordi Battle Caminal, reviewing for Fotogramas, the best of the film are the supporting characters.

Cast

References

External links
 

Spanish comedy films
2019 comedy films
2019 films
Films shot in Spain
Films set in Spain
Basque cinema
Castilian culture
Enclaves and exclaves
Tellería
Cultural depictions of William Tell
2010s Spanish films